Edward Peter Beard (January 20, 1940 – January 11, 2021) was an American businessman and politician from Rhode Island. He served in the Rhode Island House of Representatives and was a member of the United States House of Representatives.

Early life 
Born in Providence, Rhode Island, Beard attended Assumption Elementary School and Hope High School in Providence. He served in the Rhode Island National Guard from 1960 to 1966, where he completed high school as well as a college-level course in agriculture. Beard was one of only a few members of Congress in the late 20th century who was not a college graduate.  Beard worked as a house painter before entering politics.

Political career 
Beard began his political career as a member of the Rhode Island House of Representatives, serving from 1972 to 1974. In 1976, he was a delegate to the Democratic National Convention.

Elected as a Democrat to the Ninety-fourth Congress, he was re-elected to the Ninety-fifth and Ninety-sixth Congresses. Beard served in the U. S. House of Representatives from January 3, 1975, to January 3, 1981, and was chairman on the House Committee on Labor Standards. His bid for re-election to the Ninety-seventh Congress in 1980 was unsuccessful.

His complete Congressional record of sponsored and co sponsored legislation can be found at:

After leaving Congress, he owned and operated a tavern and hosted a short lived radio talk show. He served as director of elderly affairs for the City of Providence, Rhode Island, from 1986 to 2002. He was an unsuccessful candidate for the Democratic nomination to the One Hundred and Second Congress in 1990.

He was a resident of Providence, Rhode Island.

References

External links  

 Our Campaigns

	

1940 births
2021 deaths
Businesspeople from Providence, Rhode Island
Democratic Party members of the United States House of Representatives from Rhode Island
House painters
Democratic Party members of the Rhode Island House of Representatives
Politicians from Providence, Rhode Island
Rhode Island National Guard personnel
Neurological disease deaths in Rhode Island
Deaths from Parkinson's disease